Pogonomyrmex anzensis, the Anza desert harvester, is a species of ant in the family Formicidae.

References

Further reading

External links

 

anzensis
Insects described in 1968